Dr. D. Y. Patil Institute of Technology, Pimpri, Pune, was established as Dr. D. Y. Patil Women's College of Engineering in July 1998. The college was converted into a co-education college with the name Dr. D. Y. Patil Institute of Engineering & Technology, Pimpri, Pune in the academic year 2002–2003. The institute is situated in the vicinity of a Pimpri-Chinchwad industrial belt, which is one of the biggest industrial belts in Asia. The college is affiliated with Savitribai Phule Pune University. Ranked 172 in the engineering category by the National Institute of Ranking Framework (NIRF) in 2021.

The college is named after D. Y. Patil, former governor of Bihar State, Republic of India. It has a hostel for both boys and girls. The girl's hostel is just opposite the main gate of the complex and the boys hostel is a few miles away.

Academics 
Undergraduate
 Civil engineering
 Mechanical engineering
 Electronics and telecommunication engineering
 Instrumentation and control engineering
 Computer engineering
 Production (sandwich) engineering
 Information technology
 Artificial intelligence and data science (since 2020)

Postgraduate
 Computer engineering  (computer science engineering)
 Machine design (mechanical engineering)
 Heat and power (mechanical engineering)
 Environmental engineering (civil engineering)
 Management (civil engineering)
 Manufacturing engineering and automation (production engineering)
 Communication networks (electronics and telecommunication engineering)

External links 
 D Y Patil College of Engineering (DYPCE)
 

Colleges affiliated to Savitribai Phule Pune University
Engineering colleges in Pune
Universities and colleges in Pune